Hans Schwartz (1 March 1913 –  31 May 1991) was a German football player who participated at the 1934 FIFA World Cup. He played club football with Victoria Hamburg.

External links

1913 births
1991 deaths
German footballers
Association football defenders
Germany international footballers
1934 FIFA World Cup players
SC Victoria Hamburg players